Salyersville is a home rule-class city on the Licking River in Magoffin County, Kentucky, in the United States. It is the seat of its county. According to the 2010 census, the population was 1,883.

History

Early history
After an  attempt at the first settlement in 1794, the hill overlooking the Bend of the Licking River just downriver from the present town was fortified and settled  by Archibald Prater, Ebenezer Hanna, and others. Originally known as Prater's Fort, the community had become Licking Station by the time of its first post office in 1839.

In 1849, the post office was moved to the community at site of the present city and renamed Adamsville after local landowner Uncle William Adams. In addition to his farmland, Adams operated a hotel, a gristmill, a tannery and a blacksmith at the new location.

In 1860, Magoffin Co. was formed from parts of the surrounding Floyd, Johnson, and Morgan counties. Billy Adams donated land for the platting and establishment of a new county seat and the community was renamed "Salyersville" in gratitude to State Rep. Samuel Salyer, who sponsored the bill creating the new county. The post office changed the following year.

During the Civil War, Salyersville fell on hard times. Because of its location in the Upper South and its history of settlement by migrants and farmers from Virginia, some residents sided with the Confederacy despite the general lack of slaves in the area. In 1864, Union forces defeated a Confederate raiding force in the Battle of Salyersville.

Adams gave more land to the city in 1871 for the construction of a proper courthouse. It was completed in 1890 and stood for 67 years before burning to the ground in 1957.

20th century
Salyersville's first high school, the Magoffin County Institute, was founded in 1908 by A.C. Harlowe.

The Great Depression hit Salyersville hard, since such a high percentage of Salyersville's citizens were laborers or farmers, who saw prices for crops fall from 40 to 60%. Nearby mining and logging operations also closed or limited production when demand for their products fell sharply.

In 1963, the Bert T. Combs Mountain Parkway is completed, stretching west  from Salyersville to intersect with Interstate 64 at a point just east of Winchester. It enabled more tourists to visit the area, and heritage tourism began to help Salyersville develop a changed economy. The first annual Magoffin County Founder's Day Festival was held in 1978.

In the winter of 1997, as part of Kentucky's elk restoration project, Salyersville became one of the locations selected for the release of elk into the wilderness area of its mountains.

21st century

In 2002, the second Magoffin County court house (erected in 1960) was demolished. In its place, a new Justice Center was constructed, which opened in Spring 2004.The new Justice Center's architecture plays tribute to Magoffin County's original courthouse.

On March 2, 2012, Salyersville was hit by a tornado which caused extensive damage to many businesses and many homes.There were no deaths reported in the Salyersville March 2 Tornado. The Tornado was reported an EF3; There were however deaths that occurred during the Tornado that took place in West Liberty Ky. Though having their homes and businesses destroyed by the March 2nd Tornado, the people of Salyersville came together to rebuild their town. This tornado was a separate storm that formed in Wolfe County, KY, and is not the tornado that previously hit West Liberty and Wellington.  Kentucky Gov. Steve Beshear visited both cities on March 3 and toured the eastern part of the state after the tornado outbreak.

Geography
Salyersville is " North, 83°3'47" West (37.748171, -83.062984).

Climate
The climate in this area is characterized by relatively high temperatures and evenly distributed precipitation throughout the year.  The Köppen Climate System describes the weather as humid subtropical, and uses the abbreviation Cfa.

Demographics

As of the census of 2000, there were 1,604 people, 646 households, and 414 families residing in the city. The racial makeup of the city was 99.69% White, 0.06% African American, and 0.25% Native American.  0.31% of the population were Hispanic or Latino of any race.

There were 646 households, out of which 27.9% had children under the age of 18 living with them, 49.4% were married couples living together, 12.2% had a female householder with no husband present, and 35.9% were non-families. 33.9% of all households were made up of individuals, and 14.9% had someone living alone who was 65 years of age or older. The average household size was 2.22 and the average family size was 2.85.

In the city, the population was spread out, with 20.8% under the age of 18, 9.2% from 18 to 24, 26.1% from 25 to 44, 24.1% from 45 to 64, and 19.8% who were 65 years of age or older. The median age was 41 years. For every 100 females, there were 88.9 males. For every 100 females age 18 and over, there were 83.1 males.

The median income for a household in the city was $16,042, and the median income for a family was $23,393. Males had a median income of $26,534 versus $20,188 for females. The per capita income for the city was $11,881. About 35.7% of families and 40.7% of the population were below the poverty line, including 56.4% of those under the age of 18 and 34.3% of those 65 and older.

Economy
Major employers included the manufacturing company Joy Mining Machinery, which closed its Salyerville plant in 2015. Major employers now include Logan Machinery, which opened in 2016, hiring around 70 people from the area. Coal mining was once a major employer in Salyersville, however, the last mine in Magoffin County, U.S. Coal, shut down in early 2015. Most of Salyersville economic income is sourced out of town, in nearby areas, such as Georgetown KY, and Lexington KY, by the likes of tradesman. The biggest contributor to the workforce in the city, is the school system.

Arts and culture

Cultural events and fairs
 Founder's Day - Founder's day is an annual county festival for the people of Magoffin County.  It attracts those who have roots in eastern Kentucky and others who are interested in the genealogy and history of the area.  A different family surname is celebrated each year as part of the festival.  The Festival offers young people opportunities to enter contests and win prize money for excelling in academic subjects such as math, spelling, essay writing, and art. Pageants are held for young people from age 1-day to age 14 for boys and girls and for young women from age 17 to age 26. A parade, drama & fashion shows, pet shows, clogging, other dance exhibitions, and specialty acts are just a few of the festivities that are part of Founder's Day.

 Street Dance - Each year there is a public square dance in downtown Salyersville. The intersection surrounding the downtown courthouse was blocked off for the event which went well into the night.
 Independence Day Festival - Independence Day is celebrated in Salyersville with a parade and pageants.

Museums
 Pioneer Village - Located near downtown Salyersville, Pioneer Village is a complex of 15 original log cabins that have been restored and preserved through the efforts of the Magoffin County Historical Society. Together the cabins form a living history museum, where staff create displays and demonstrations of early crafts. The cabins in Pioneer Village often date back to the early 19th century. Donated cabins are disassembled with care, the logs numbered and cleaned, and they are transported and reassembled in the Pioneer Village.

Monuments
 Several marble monuments are located downtown near the Pioneer Village cabins, including the 'Founder's Pyramid', a surname marker, a county marker, an American Civil War memorial, and a memorial soldier's bell. The George "Golden Hawk Sizemore" grave and monument sits at the Mouth of Oakly Cemetery, and the Tip Top coal camp marker sits at the head of the creek.

Historical markers
 Civil War Action - This marker, located near Puncheon Creek in Salyersville, states: "On mission to clear area of CSA forces, Col. Geo. W. Gallup with USA troops repulsed Confederate attack led by Lt. Colonel E. F. Clay at Paintsville April 13, 1864, and pursued enemy to this point. Union men attacked next day. Clay was mortally wounded: CSA suffered 60 casualties and 60 men, 200 horses, 400 saddles, 300 small-arms taken. USA sustained only slight losses."
 County Named, 1860 - This marker, located in downtown Salyersville, describes the biography of Gov. Beriah Magoffin, the county namesake.
 First Settlement - This marker at the eastern Salyersville city limits describes the founding of the town by European Americans.
 Ivy Point Skirmishes - This marker on Ivy Point Hill tells of skirmishes during the Civil War.
 Reuben Patrick Grave - This marker notes a Civil War action by Patrick, who also served as a Kentucky state legislator, 1863–1867.
 Wm. "Uncle Billie" Adams - This marker in the downtown tells a short biography of one of the founders.

Parks
 Ramey Memorial Park - This park offers picnic shelters, picnic tables, a playground, a walking track, basketball courts, tennis courts, and baseball fields as well as a swimming pool (open during the summer). The park has access to a steel bridge that crosses the Licking River, connecting the park to the historic Pioneer Village and a monument commemorating veterans of war from Magoffin County.

Education
Salyersville's public schools are operated by the Magoffin County Board of Education. Salyersville's Magoffin County High School mascot is the Hornets.

The Magoffin County Career and Technical Center, teaches students tradesman skills, in the fields of welding, electrical work, carpentry, law enforcement, Agriculture, and medical services. As of 2019 Vince Minix, is acting Principal over the Career and Tech center. Some of the instructors include, Rodney Whitiker “Welding”, Robert Arnett “Electricity“, Anthony Taubee ”law enforcement”, and recently Nick Stevens “Agriculture“.

Public schools in Salyersville include: Magoffin Co. High School, Herald Whitaker Middle School, North Magoffin Elementary, Salyersville Elementary School, and South Magoffin Elementary.

Salyersville has a lending library, the Magoffin County Public Library.

Media
The local weekly newspapers in Salyersville include The Salyersville Independent and the Trading Post, mostly for advertising.  Founded in 1921, The Salyersville Independent circulates over 4,000 copies every Thursday.  It is currently owned and published by Ritt Mortimer.

Cable service in Salyersville is provided by Rick Howard Cable, Frank Howard Cable and Foothills Cooperative. Through these companies, Salyersville is provided with standard and premium cable TV service, high-speed Internet access and telephone service. Frank Howard Cable and Rick Howard Cable offer local programming via MCTV (Magoffin County Television) and MCSTV (Magoffin County School TV), a channel dedicated to local school programming. MCTV carries a daily local news media program "Your News Today."

"Your News Today" is a nightly local news broadcast that airs on Howard's Cable and Foothills Communication. It was started in 1998 by Ritt Mortimer.

Salyersville's radio stations include the local WRLV Pure Country 106.5. Stations of surrounding counties can also be heard, such as Prestonsburg's WQHY (FM) 95.5, Paintsville's WKLW (FM) 94.7, and West Liberty's Kick 102.9.

Notable people
 Abraham Lincoln Collinsworth, member "Fiddling Five" Championship UK basketball team
 Jimmy Flynt, co-founder of Hustler magazine
 Larry Flynt, publisher of Hustler magazine
 Rebecca Lynn Howard, country singer songwriter
Buell Kazee, bluegrass singer, minister
Chase Lewis, musician 
John Morgan Salyer, fiddler
 Samuel "The Fiddling Legislator" Salyer
Thomas J. Whitaker, Appalachian Artist 
Charlie Sizemore, Bluegrass singer

References

External links
 Magoffin County Schools
 Magoffin County Historical Society

 
Cities in Magoffin County, Kentucky
Cities in Kentucky
County seats in Kentucky
1867 establishments in Kentucky